The history of Oxford in England dates back to its original settlement in the Saxon period. Originally of strategic significance due to its controlling location on the upper reaches of the River Thames at its junction with the River Cherwell. The town grew in national importance during the Norman period. The University of Oxford was established in the 12th-century and would eventually dominate the activity within the town, this also resulted in several town and gown conflicts. The city was besieged during The Anarchy in 1142 and Oxford Castle was attacked during the Barons War in the early 13th century. Oxford was greatly affected during the English Reformation, brought on by Henry VIII in his dissolution of the monasteries. The town also played an important role in the English Civil War, where it experienced another siege when it housed the court of Charles I.

Later in the 19th and 20th century, the town grew and underwent an industrial boom where major printing and car-manufacturing industries began establishing in the city. These industries later declined in the 1970s and 1980s, leaving behind a city that is now well known for its education and tourist industry.

Medieval period 

Oxford was first settled by the Anglo-Saxons and was initially known in Old English as Oxnaford and in Old Norse as Öxnafurða. The name comes from "oxen's ford", which literally meant oxen's shallow river crossing. Around 900, an important north-south route for cattle connecting the south of England to the Midlands needed to cross the River Thames. At Oxford, the Thames splits into many channels, offering a relatively shallow and hence crossable location for people, goods and animals. Oxford thus became a heavily trafficked crossing point and the early Anglo-Saxon settlement developed around the location. There is still speculation about the precise location of the ford that gave Oxford its name, though any approach to Oxford involved the use of several fords, and thus there were likely multiple fords in use throughout the history of the crossing. Most archeological evidence generally points to the south-west of Oxford where there are low elevations and branching streams that offer shallow crossings.In the 10th century, Oxford became an important military frontier town between the kingdoms of Mercia and Wessex and was raided by Danes. In 1002, many Danes were killed in Oxford during the St. Brice's Day massacre ordered by Æthelred the Unready. The skeletons of more than thirty suspected victims were unearthed in 2008 during the course of building work at St John's College. The ‘massacre’ was a contributing factor to King Sweyn I of Denmark’s invasion of England in 1003 and the sacking of Oxford by the Danes in 1004.

Oxford was heavily damaged during the Norman Invasion in 1066. Following the conquest, the town was assigned to a governor, Robert D'Oyly, who ordered the construction of Oxford Castle to confirm Norman authority over the area. Robert D'Oyly also ordered the construction of a stone causeway, known as Grandpont for traffic, including Oxen and the carts that they drew, to cross over the flood plains. D'Oyly set up a monastic community in the castle consisting of a chapel and living quarters for monks (St George in the Castle). The community never grew large but it earned its place in history as one of Britain's oldest places of formal education. It was there that in 1139 Geoffrey of Monmouth wrote his History of the Kings of Britain, a compilation of Arthurian legends. 

During the period of Middle English, Oxford's pronunciation evolved to become Oxenford, as written in "Clerkes Tale of Oxenford" in Chaucer's The Canterbury Tales. Eventually, Modern English saw Oxenford elided to become Oxford, as it is known today.

Additionally, there is evidence of Jews living in the city as early as 1141, and during the 12th century the Jewish community is estimated to have numbered about 80–100. The city was besieged during The Anarchy in 1142. In 1191, a city charter translated from Latin wrote,

Oxford's prestige was enhanced by its charter granted by King Henry II, granting its citizens the same privileges and exemptions as those enjoyed by the capital of the kingdom; and various important religious houses were founded in or near the city. Oxford's status as a liberty obtained from this period until the 19th century. A grandson of King John established Rewley Abbey for the Cistercian Order; and friars of various orders (Dominicans, Franciscans, Carmelites, Augustinians and Trinitarians) all had houses of varying importance at Oxford. Parliaments were often held in the city during the 13th century. The Provisions of Oxford were instigated by a group of barons led by Simon de Montfort; these documents are often regarded as England's first written constitution. Richard I (reigned 1189–1199) and King John (reigned 1199–1216) the sons of Henry II, were both born at Beaumont Palace in Oxford, on 8 September 1157 and 24 December 1166 respectively. A plaque in Beaumont Street commemorates these events.

University of Oxford 
The University of Oxford is first mentioned in 12th-century records. Of the hundreds of aularian houses that sprang up across the city, only St Edmund Hall remains. What put an end to the halls was the emergence of colleges. Oxford's earliest colleges were University College (1249), Balliol (1263) and Merton (1264). These colleges were established at a time when Europeans were starting to translate the writings of Greek philosophers. These writings challenged European ideology, inspiring scientific discoveries and advancements in the arts, as society began to see itself in a new way. These colleges at Oxford were supported by the Church in the hope of reconciling Greek philosophy and Christian theology. The relationship between "town and gown" has often been uneasy – as many as 93 students and townspeople were killed in the St Scholastica Day Riot of 1355.

Tudor period 
The sweating sickness epidemic in 1517 was particularly devastating to Oxford and Cambridge where it killed half of both cities' populations, including many students and dons. Christ Church Cathedral, Oxford is unique in combining a college chapel and a cathedral in one foundation. Originally St Frideswide's Priory, the building was extended and incorporated into the structure of the Cardinal's College shortly before its refounding as Christ Church in 1546, since when it has functioned as the cathedral of the Diocese of Oxford. The Oxford Martyrs were tried for heresy in 1555 and subsequently burnt at the stake, on what is now Broad Street, for their religious beliefs and teachings. The three martyrs were the bishops Hugh Latimer and Nicholas Ridley, and the archbishop Thomas Cranmer. The Martyrs' Memorial stands nearby, round the corner to the north on St Giles'.

Early modern period 

During the English Civil War, Oxford housed the court of Charles I in 1642, after the king was expelled from London. In 1646, during the Siege of Oxford, the town eventually surrendered to Parliamentarian forces commanded by General Fairfax, and occupied by Colonel Richard Ingoldsby. In the final period of the English Civil War in 1652, as news of Charles II approaching the city, the Parliamentarians proceeded to pull down defenses in the Oxford Castle where they were garrisoned and retreated to New College, this resulted in great damage to the college in the process.

It later housed the court of Charles II during the Great Plague of London in 1665–1666. Although reluctant to do so, he was forced to evacuate when the plague got too close. The city suffered two serious fires in 1644 and 1671. The town underwent a radical makeover of its buildings during this period, with the most notable being Tom Tower in Christ Church, the Sheldonian Theatre and the Botanic Gardens.

The mid-to-late 18th century saw other great new landmarks added to the city such as the Radcliffe Camera and the Radcliffe Observatory. While in 1785, a new prison complex was built on the site of the old dilapidated Oxford Castle after it was judged to be in a poor state by John Howard, as the castle had been used as the local prison after the civil war.

Late modern period 
In 1790, the Oxford Canal connected the city with Coventry. The Duke's Cut was completed by the Duke of Marlborough in 1789 to link the new canal with the River Thames; and, in 1796, the Oxford Canal company built its own link to the Thames, at Isis Lock. In 1844, the Great Western Railway linked Oxford with London via Didcot and Reading, and other rail routes soon followed. In the 19th century, the controversy surrounding the Oxford Movement in the Church of England drew attention to the city as a focus of theological thought. A permanent military presence was established in the city with the completion of Cowley Barracks in 1876.

Local government in Oxford was reformed by the Municipal Corporations Act 1835, and the boundaries of the borough were extended to include a small area east of the River Cherwell. The boundaries were further extended in 1889 to add the areas of Grandpont and New Hinksey, south of the Thames, which were transferred from Berkshire to Oxfordshire. At the same time Summertown and the western part of Cowley were also added to the borough. In 1890 Oxford became a county borough. Oxford Town Hall was built by Henry T. Hare; the foundation stone was laid on 6 July 1893 and opened by the future King Edward VII on 12 May 1897. The site has been the seat of local government since the Guild Hall of 1292 and though Oxford is a city and a Lord Mayoralty, the building is still called by its traditional name of "Town Hall".

20th and 21st centuries 
During the First World War, the population of Oxford changed. The number of University members was significantly reduced as students, fellows and staff enlisted. Some of their places in college accommodation were taken by soldiers in training. Another reminder of the ongoing war was found in the influx of wounded and disabled soldiers, who were treated in new hospitals housed in buildings such as the university's Examination School, the town hall and Somerville College. During the Second World War, Oxford was largely ignored by the German air raids during the Blitz, primarily as Hitler had plans to make Oxford the new capital city.  Also perhaps due to the lack of heavy industry such as steelworks or shipbuilding that would have made it a target, although it was still affected by the rationing and influx of refugees fleeing London and other cities. The university's colleges served as temporary military barracks and training areas for soldiers before deployment.By the early 20th century, there was rapid industrial and population growth, with the printing and publishing industries becoming well established by the 1920s. In 1929 the boundaries of the city were extended to include the suburbs of Headington, Cowley and Iffley to the east, and Wolvercote to the north. Also during the 1920s, the economy and society of Oxford underwent a huge transformation as William Morris established Morris Motors Limited to mass-produce cars in Cowley, on the south-eastern edge of the city. By the early 1970s over 20,000 people worked in Cowley at the huge Morris Motors and Pressed Steel Fisher plants. Oxford was now a city of two halves: the university city to the west of Magdalen Bridge and the car town to the east. This led to the witticism that "Oxford is the left bank of Cowley". 

On 6 May 1954, Roger Bannister, a 25-year-old medical student, ran the first authenticated sub-four-minute mile at the Iffley Road running track in Oxford. Although he had previously studied at Oxford University, Bannister was studying at St Mary's Hospital Medical School in London at the time. He later returned to Oxford University and became Master of Pembroke College. Oxford's second university, Oxford Brookes University, formerly the Oxford School of Art, then Oxford Polytechnic, based at Headington Hill, was given its charter in 1991 and for ten years has been voted the best new university in the UK. It was named to honour the school's founding principal, John Henry Brookes.

Cowley suffered major job losses in the 1980s and 1990s during the decline of British Leyland, but is now producing the successful Mini for BMW on a smaller site. Much of the original car factory at Cowley was demolished in the 1990s, and is now the site of the Oxford Business Park. The influx of migrant labour to the car plants and hospitals, recent immigration from South Asia, and a large student population, have given Oxford a notably cosmopolitan character, especially in the Headington and Cowley Road areas with their many bars, cafes, restaurants, clubs, Asian shops and fast food outlets and the annual Cowley Road Carnival. Oxford is one of the most diverse small cities in Britain: the most recent population estimates for 2011 showed that 22% of the population were from black or minority ethnic groups, compared to 13% in England.

See also 
 St. Brice's Day massacre (1003)
 Siege of Oxford (1142)
 Oxford Parliament (1258)
 St Scholastica Day riot (1355)
 Oxford Martyrs (1555)
 Oxford Parliament (1644)
 Oxford Parliament (1681)
 Timeline of Oxford

References

Bibliography

Published in the 19th century

Published in the 20th century

Published in the 21st century

External links

 A Brief History of Oxford
 The Oxford Guide: Category History